Preamar is a Brazilian drama television series that premiered on HBO Latin America. The series was produced by HBO's local partner, Pindorama Filmes.  It first aired on May 6, 2012, being broadcast on Sundays at 9 O'clock pm (local Brazilian time: UTC -3).

The plot of the series explores the environment of the informal trade that exists on the beaches of Rio de Janeiro, which, according to series production, generates about $7 billion per year.

Overview 
The series follows the story of João Ricardo Velasco, a successful banker that lost everything from a Ponzi Scheme. The only thing left is his beachfront apartment in Ipanema.

Without revealing his real situation for the family, he starts working in the informal market, a territory that follows its own rules. Soon he becomes an associate of Xeriffe, who controls the cash-only business on the beach, and becomes Xeriffe's confidant and part owner of the grey market business on Ipanema.

João has been married for 25 years to Maria Isabel, with whom he has two children: Fred and Manu.

Episodes

  O Mergulho (Taking a Dive) 
  A Lei Da Praia (Beach's Law) 
  Quando a Demanda é Maior Que a Oferta (When Demand is Greater Than Supply) 
  Àguas Profundas (Deep Waters) 
  Aparência e Carisma (Appearance and Charisma) 
  Ano Novo (New Year) 
  Por Causas Mais Nobres (For Noble Causes) 
  Maré de Lua Nova (New Moon Tide) 
  Arco-íris (Rainbow) 
  A Vida Parece Uma Festa (Life is Like a Party) 
  Xilindrê (The Slammer) 
  É Carnaval (It's Carnival) 
  Águas de Março (March Waters)

References

External links
 Official page at HBO Brazil (in Portuguese)

Brazilian television series
Brazilian drama television series
Portuguese-language HBO original programming
HBO Latin America original programming
2010s Brazilian television series
2012 Brazilian television series debuts
Television shows set in Rio de Janeiro (city)